Stefan Lindner (born: 7 April 1966) is a sailor from Klagenfurt, Austria. who represented his country at the 1992 Summer Olympics in Barcelona, Spain as crew member in the Soling. With helmsman Michael Luschan and fellow crew member Georg Stadlerr they took the 19th place.

References

Living people
1966 births
Sailors at the 1992 Summer Olympics – Soling
Olympic sailors of Austria
Austrian male sailors (sport)